I Am 9 is the ninth studio album by King Creosote. It was released in 1999.

Track listing
Lullaby
Stalking the Famous
The Fat Messiah
In the Lift
Much in Like
Rise
Nobody Gives a Toss
Meantime
Dank Tenner Shone
Wunder Woman
Mr Benn
I am 99 Days Old

References
King Creosote: Music

1999 albums
King Creosote albums